Beat is the UK's leading charity supporting those affected by eating disorders and campaigning on their behalf. Founded in 1989 as the Eating Disorders Association, it celebrated its 30th anniversary in 2019.

The charity is dedicated to helping people with anorexia nervosa, bulimia, binge eating disorder, avoidant/restrictive food intake disorder, and other specified feeding or eating disorder, and providing information to the public about these conditions.

History
The charity was founded in 1989 from the amalgamation of the existing UK charities, Anorexic Aid and Anorexic Family Aid. The Society for the Advancement of Research into Anorexia merged with the Eating Disorders Association in 1992. Beat became the Eating Disorders Association's working title in 2007, and was formally adopted in 2018.

Activities

Support services
As well as campaigning for better services for those affected by eating disorders, the charity provides self-help support through several different projects:
 Helplines: The charity runs three national helplines, one for adults, one for young people under 25, and one for students. Telephone, email, and one-to-one webchat services are available.
 Online Services: The charity's website includes message boards, an online chat facility, online support groups, and a HelpFinder directory.
 Peer support: The charity runs Echo, a telephone-based peer support for carers, in some parts of the country.

Campaigning
Beat actively campaigns for better services and understanding of eating disorders. Eating Disorders Awareness Week (EDAW) takes place annually.

Ambassadors
The Ambassador scheme allows people who have recovered from an eating disorder to take an active part in Beat's work. They represent Beat in the media or at conferences and events, speaking about their experiences to help reduce the stigma and educate others. Beat received funding in 2013 from Young Start to grow the scheme in Scotland.

Training and Continuing Professional Development 
Beat runs conferences and training, providing knowledge, education and training to carers, healthcare and education professionals, and other organisations in both the private and public sector.

The Eating Disorder International Conference (EDIC), aimed at academics, researchers, clinicians and others working in the field of eating disorders runs every two years.

Awards
The charity was a runner up in the healthcare and medical research section of the UK Charity Awards 2007. It also received the national Wellbeing Award of the Children and Young People's Services Awards 2007 for its work in developing a forum for young people, and in particular for the charity's active involvement of young people in informing its work, via the forum. The charity was awarded NHS England's now defunct Information Standard quality mark in 2011 to ensure the healthcare information it provides is of high quality and reliable. It received the 2011 Nominet Internet Award, Empowering Young People & Citizens, Exciting Newcomer award for My Personal Best. In 2015 Beat's Young Ambassador team in Scotland won the volunteers' award at the National Scottish Health Awards, in recognition of their contribution to improving health and wellbeing in NHS Scotland.

Funding
Beat is funded from a variety of sources – from community fundraising, donations, trusts and grant applications to professional services and government grants. Often, the funding received is to focus on particular support services.

The Youthline is supported by BBC Children in Need and Comic Relief.

References

External links
 Official site

Eating disorder organizations
Health in Norfolk
Organisations based in Norwich
Organizations established in 1989
Health charities in the United Kingdom
1989 establishments in the United Kingdom